Raluca Georgiana Șerban (born 17 June 1997) is a Romanian-born professional tennis player, who since 2019 has represented Cyprus.

Career
Șerban has career-high WTA rankings of 164 in singles and 176 in doubles. She has won 13 singles and 14 doubles titles on the ITF Women's Circuit.

She made her WTA Tour main-draw debut at the 2018 Luxembourg Open, in the doubles event partnering Isabella Shinikova.

At the 2022 Budapest Grand Prix, she made her WTA Tour singles debut.

Grand Slam singles performance timeline

ITF Circuit finals

Singles: 20 (13 titles, 7 runner–ups)

Doubles: 27 (14 titles, 13 runner–ups)

National representation

Games of the Small States of Europe

Singles: 1 (1 win)

Doubles: 2 (2 wins)

Mixed doubles: 3 (2 wins, 1 runner-up)

Notes

References

External links
 
 
 

Romanian female tennis players
Cypriot female tennis players
Sportspeople from Constanța
1997 births
Living people
Romanian expatriates in Cyprus